Ground effect may refer to:

 Ground effect (aerodynamics), the increased lift and decreased aerodynamic drag of a wing close to a fixed surface
 Ground effect (cars), an effect that creates downforce, primarily in racing cars
 Ground effect vehicle, a vehicle which attains level flight near the surface of the Earth due to ground effect
 Ground effect train, an alternative to a magnetic levitation train, using ground effect in aircraft to prevent the vehicle from making contact with the ground

ca:Efecte terra
de:Bodeneffekt
el:Αρχή επίδρασης του εδάφους
es:Efecto suelo
fr:Effet de sol
ja:地面効果
lt:Ekrano efektas
pl:Efekt przypowierzchniowy
pt:Efeito Solo
ru:Экранный эффект
zh:地面效应